Amado Azar (December 31, 1913 – April 11, 1971) was an Argentine boxer who competed in the 1932 Summer Olympics. In 1932 he won the silver medal in the middleweight class after losing the final against Carmen Barth of the United States. Azar was the brother of fellow boxer Jorje Azar.

1932 Olympic results
Below is the record of Amado Azar, an Argentinian middleweight boxer who competed at the 1932 Los Angeles Olympics:

 Round of 16: bye
 Quarterfinal: defeated Aldo Longinotti (Italy) by decision
 Semifinal: defeated Roger Michelot (France) by decision
 Final: lost to Carmen Barth (United States) by decision (was awarded silver medal)

References
Amado Azar's profile at databaseOlympics.com

Amado Azar's profile at Sports Reference.com
Amado Azar's profile in Narices Chatas
Mention of Amado Azar's death 

1913 births
1971 deaths
Argentine male boxers
Boxers at the 1932 Summer Olympics
Middleweight boxers
Olympic boxers of Argentina
Olympic silver medalists for Argentina
Olympic medalists in boxing
Medalists at the 1932 Summer Olympics